Sir (Joseph Percival) William Mallalieu (18 June 1908 – 13 March 1980) was a British Labour Party politician, journalist and author.

Life
He was of Huguenot origin, a son of Frederick Mallalieu, a Member of Parliament. Mallalieu's ancestors had settled at Saddleworth in the early 1600s, where they lived in humble circumstances working as weavers. Frederick Mallalieu's father, Henry (1831–1902), was a self-made businessman, at the age of twelve a hand-loom weaver. He became a woollen manufacturer, chairman of ironworks companies, and magistrate.

Mallalieu was educated at the Dragon School in Oxford, Cheltenham College, Trinity College, Oxford, and the University of Chicago. He was President of the Oxford Union in 1930 and a rugby blue. He served in the Royal Navy 1942–45, joining as an ordinary seaman and later being commissioned and promoted to lieutenant.  His novel, Very Ordinary Seaman, is based on his experiences in the navy.

From 1945 to 1950, Mallalieu was Member of Parliament for Huddersfield; and then, after boundary changes,  for Huddersfield East from 1950 to 1979.  He had various ministerial positions under Harold Wilson, including Minister of Defence for the Royal Navy (1966–1967), the Board of Trade (1967–1968) and Technology (1968–1969).

Mallalieu is the author of Rats! (Left Book Club, 1941) under the pseudonym 'The Pied Piper'. A collection of his writing on various sports, mostly written for The Spectator, was published as Sporting Days (The Sportsmans Book Club, 1957).

He was given the Freedom of Kirklees in West Yorkshire on 27 January 1980.

Family
In 1945, Mallalieu married Harriet Rita Riddle Tinn, daughter of Jack Tinn, manager of Portsmouth F.C. from 1927 to 1947. Their daughter, Ann, is a Labour peer. Mallalieu's brother Lance was also a Member of Parliament. His uncle, Albert Henry Mallalieu, was head of that family of Tan-y-Marian, Llandudno.

Arms

References

External links 
 

1908 births
1980 deaths
Labour Party (UK) MPs for English constituencies
Presidents of the Oxford Union
Knights Bachelor
People educated at The Dragon School
People educated at Cheltenham College
Alumni of Trinity College, Oxford
University of Chicago alumni
UK MPs 1945–1950
UK MPs 1950–1951
UK MPs 1951–1955
UK MPs 1955–1959
UK MPs 1959–1964
UK MPs 1964–1966
UK MPs 1966–1970
UK MPs 1970–1974
UK MPs 1974
UK MPs 1974–1979
Royal Navy sailors
Royal Navy officers of World War II
Ministers in the Wilson governments, 1964–1970